Events in the year 1821 in Norway.

Incumbents
Monarch: Charles III John

Events
 1 August - The Nobility of Norway is abolished.
 Fredrik Meltzer designs the modern flag of Norway to replace the modified Danish and Swedish flags then in use.
 Thomas Fasting became the first individual ever convicted in an impeachment trial by the Norwegian Constitutional Court of the Realm (Riksrett).

Arts and literature

Births
2 May – Jens Andreas Friis, linguist and author (d.1896)
14 July – Jens Holmboe, politician and Minister (d.1891)
17 August – Jacob Andreas Michelsen, businessperson and politician (d.1902)
23 August – Christian Collett Kjerschow, politician (d.1889)
24 October – James DeNoon Reymert, newspaper editor, mine operator, lawyer and politician (d.1896)
18 November – Johan Jørgen Lange Hanssen, politician (d.1889)

Full date unknown
Eilev Jonsson Steintjønndalen, Hardanger fiddle maker (d.1876)

Deaths
14 January – Jens Zetlitz, priest and poet (b.1761)
5 March – Gabriel Schanche Kielland, businessman and ship owner (b.1760)
20 May –  Abraham Pihl, clergyman, astronomer and architect (b.1756).
21 November – Jonas Rein, priest, poet and member of the Norwegian Constituent Assembly at Eidsvoll (b.1760)

See also

References